Nebria mellyi is a species of ground beetle in the Nebriinae subfamily that is endemic to Russia.

References

mellyi
Beetles of Asia
Endemic fauna of Russia
Beetles described in 1847